Numb may refer to:

Biology and healthcare
 NUMB (gene), a human gene
 Numb, having deficient physical sensation (see hypoesthesia)
 Numb, having deficient sensation (psychology)

Arts, entertainment, and media

Music

Groups
 Numb (band), a Canadian industrial band
 Northwestern University Wildcat Marching Band, or NUMB

Albums 
 Numb (Hammerbox album), 1993
 Numb (Linea 77 album), 2003
 The Numb E.P., a 1996 EP by Baboon
 Numb, a 2022 album by Lewis Taylor

Songs 
 "Numb" (August Alsina song), 2013
 "Numb" (Hayden James song), 2017
 "Numb" (Holly McNarland song), 1997
 "Numb" (Honey Ryder song), 2008
 "Numb" (Linkin Park song), 2003
 "Numb" (Marshmello and Khalid song), 2022
 "Numb" (Pet Shop Boys song), 2006
 "Numb" (Portishead song), 1994
 "Numb" (Rihanna song), 2012
 "Numb" (U2 song), 1993
 "Numb" (Usher song), 2012
 "Numb" (Veridia song), 2018
 "Numb", a song by The Airborne Toxic Event
 "Numb", a song by David Archuleta
 "Numb", a song by Jaira Burns
 "Numb", a song by Gary Clark Jr. from the album Blak and Blu
 "Numb", a song by Pink from the album Missundaztood
 "Numb", a song by Archive from the album You All Look the Same to Me
 "Numb", a song by Disturbed from the album The Sickness
 "Numb", a song by Drowning Pool from the album Desensitized
 "Numb", a song by Erika Costell
 "Numb", a song by Marina and the Diamonds from the album The Family Jewels
 "Numb", a song by Nick Jonas from his self-titled album
 "Numb", a song by Slapshock from the album Project 11-41
 "Numb", a song by XXXTentacion from the album ?
 "N.U.M.B", by a song by Diana Vickers from the album Songs from the Tainted Cherry Tree
 “Numb”, a song by Robbie Williams from Under the Radar Volume 2
 Numb, a song by Roomie

Other uses in arts, entertainment, and media
 Numb (2007 film), a 2007 film starring Matthew Perry
 Numb (2015 film), a Canadian film 
 "Numb" (The Killing), an episode of the American television drama series The Killing

See also 
 "Comfortably Numb", a 1979 song by Pink Floyd, also covered by Scissor Sisters
 Num (disambiguation)
 Number (disambiguation)